Marvin Wesley Vye Jr. (July 15, 1913 – August 17, 1976) was an American character actor. He is best known for portraying Prince Ken Arok in the comedy film Road to Bali.

Early years 
Vye was born in Quincy, Massachusetts, and educated at Yale University.

Career 
Vye's first film was Golden Earrings (1947). He appeared in numerous films in the 1940s and 1950s, often in exotic roles. He portrayed a villainous Merlin the Magician in the 1949 Bing Crosby musical comedy, A Connecticut Yankee in King Arthur's Court, and the scheming Prince Arok in 1952's Road to Bali, a comedy co-starring Crosby and Bob Hope.

On Broadway, Vye debuted in Hamlet (1936). He also created the role of Jigger Cragin in the original production of Rodgers and Hammerstein's Carousel. Vye was also set to appear as the Kralaholme in the original production of  The King and I, but as rehearsals went on he lost his only two musical numbers and left the show.

In 1958 Vye appeared as Virgie on the television western Tales of Wells Fargo in the episode titled "Butch Cassidy" and as Palmer in the episode "The Stunt Man" of the CBS situation comedy Mr. Adams and Eve.

In 1959, Vye portrayed gangster George "Bugs" Moran, rival of Chicago's top organized-crime figure, in Al Capone, which starred Rod Steiger in the title role.

He did guest-star appearances in many television series throughout the 1950s and 1960s, including Maverick, M Squad, The Untouchables, Bonanza, Bat Masterson, The Rifleman, Perry Mason, Wagon Train, The Beverly Hillbillies and The Lucy Show.

Personal life
On April 7, 1935, Vye married Patricia Savage in Nashua, New Hampshire. On January 17, 1936, a judge in Boston granted her an uncontested divorce.

Death 
Vye died of natural causes on August 17, 1976, in a motel room in Pompano Beach, Florida at age 63.

Partial filmography (as actor)

 Golden Earrings (1947) as Zoltan
 Whispering Smith (1948) as Blake Barton
 A Connecticut Yankee in King Arthur's Court (1949) as Merlin
 Pickup (1951) (uncredited)
 Assignment – Paris! (1952) as Medical Officer at Prisoner Exchange (uncredited)
 Road to Bali (1952) as Arok
 Destination Gobi (1953) as Kengtu
 Pickup on South Street (1953) as Capt. Dan Tiger
 River of No Return (1954) as Dave Colby
 Black Horse Canyon (1954) as Jennings
 Green Fire (1954) as El Moro
 Escape to Burma (1955) as Makesh
 Pearl of the South Pacific (1955) as Halemano 
 Voodoo Island (1957) as Barney Finch
 This Could Be the Night (1957) as Waxie London
 Short Cut to Hell (1957) as Nichols
 The Walter Winchell File (1957, Episode: "The Law and Aaron Benjamin") as Zero
 Girl in the Woods (1958) as Whitlock
 In Love and War (1958) as Charlie Scanlon (uncredited)
 Rally Round the Flag, Boys! (1958) as Oscar Hoffa (uncredited)
 Al Capone (1959) as George 'Bugs' Moran
 The Boy and the Pirates (1960) as Blackbeard
 The Big Bankroll (1961) as Williams
 The George Raft Story (1961) as Johnny Fuller
 Andy (1965) as Bartender

References

External links

 
 
 

1913 births
1976 deaths
American male film actors
20th-century American male actors
People from Quincy, Massachusetts
Male actors from Massachusetts